Operatunity was a talent search— and Michael Waldman's film that documented it— in which the English National Opera conducted a nationwide search to find someone in the United Kingdom without professional opera experience, who could be coached to sing in a staged opera— Verdi's Rigoletto in the event— on the stage of   London's Coliseum Theatre in the company of world-class performers, part of the ENO's regular season.

Audition and choosing

The audition process followed a casting call for submitted videotapes, that resulted in some 2500 entries from a colorful group of which a hundred were auditioned in person, on a bus tour that encompassed regional auditions, which led to a series of London workshops for the final six participants, including an investment banker, a builder—who stood on a scaffolding at a construction site to belt out a Neapolitan song— an ex-police officer, wrestler and model, a supermarket cashier, and a blind mother of three. The finalists received intense vocal coaching and dramatic technique, as well as physical training and the fundamentals of stagecraft. Two finalists were selected, Jane Gilchrist and Denise Leigh, who shared the demanding role of Gilda onstage, in March 2003. The documentary follows their nerve-racking final days before the performance and the exhilaration of their operatic debut, combining real-life drama with the high theatrical drama and emotional intensity of grand opera.

In a sense, Operatunity was an expansion of ENO's program for young opera singers, The Knack, directed by Mary King, a panel member for Operatunity. A criterion for the selection, in addition to raw vocal talent, was the ability of a singer rapidly to put into practice guidance from the coaches. The other members of the panel consisted of Anthony Legge, head of music at the English National opera,  Karen Gillingham, an actress singer trained at The Knack, Paul Daniel, conductor at ENO, and Philip Traugott, a classical music album producer.

Winners

The winners followed up with concert tours and at the end of the year joined to sing the children's duet from Engelbert Humperdinck's Hansel and Gretel, broadcast on BBC Four, Christmas Day 2003.

Operatunity won a RAI Prix Italia in 2003.

Australia

ABC TV and Opera Australia combined to produce Operatunity Oz, which offered Australians the comparable “operatunity”.

New Zealand
Operatunity is a national concert company formed in the year 2000 which is now the major employer of singers in New Zealand. The founders Susan Boland (Artistic and Managing Director) and John Cameron (Director and CFO) perform regularly in their Daytime Concerts Series alongside many other professional New Zealand artists. They produce 8 national tours every year covering a variety of genres and tour to 24 different centres across New Zealand, performing over 200 concerts every year.

Operatunity's Daytime Concerts are at 11am, and the ticket price includes a light lunch after the concert which is served by the performers. The Daytime Series are quality concerts which provide a fun family atmosphere, and are loved by seniors across New Zealand.

From the concerts Operatunity Travel has grown into what is now Australasias largest specialist Music Travel company taking thousands of music lovers around the world to attend their particular brand of operas and shows and the finer sights of the world. All tours are escorted by the performers that appear in the concerts and are renowned for their high quality offerings.

References
PBS: Great Performances: Operatunity
BBC News, "Operatunity knocks as prize is shared" 25 February 2003
Jane Gilchrist "The Story Behind The Camera In Jane's Own Words"
RAI Prix Italia 2003
Denise Leigh - biography and details of her career since Operatunity
- The New Zealand Operatunity Daytime Concert Series.

Opera competitions
2003 television films
2003 films